(), also known as , and , is a form of  , Chinese robe, which was derived from the Qing dynasty , the traditional dress of the Manchu people, which were worn by Manchu men. The  was actually developed by the Han Chinese through the modification of their own Ming dynasty's  by adopting some Manchu men's clothing elements in one of their  .

Terminology

General term 

The term  is composed of two Chinese characters: 《》which can literally be translated as "long" in length and 《》, which literally means "shirt". The term  is also composed of the Chinese character  and the Chinese 《》, which is literally means "robe".

Specific term 
The Mandarin Chinese word  is cognate with the Cantonese term . This was then borrowed into English as "cheongsam."

Unlike the Mandarin term, however, the  can refer to both male and female garments. In Hong Kong the term is frequently used to refer to the female garment, cheongsam, rather than the male garment .

Because of the long British presence in Hong Kong, that local usage has become reflected in the meaning of cheongsam in English, which refers exclusively to the female garment.

Origins and development 
What is now known as the Chinese  was developed by the Han Chinese during the Qing dynasty. The Qing dynasty Chinese  started to be worn by the Han Chinese after the Manchu conquest. The Chinese  was actually a modified version of the  worn in the Ming dynasty (1368–1644 AD), the preceding dynasty before the Qing dynasty, and was modelled after the Manchu's men's . 

The Han Chinese thus adopted certain Manchu elements when modifying their Ming dynasty , such as by slimming their , by adopting the  collar of the Manchu, and by using buttons and loops at the neck and sides. Despite the shared similarities with Manchu's , the Chinese  differed structurally from the Manchu's .

History

The precursors of both the changshan and the qipao were introduced to China during the Qing dynasty (17th–20th centuries). The Manchus in 1636 ordered that all Han Chinese should adopt the Manchu's hairstyle as well as their attire of dress or face harsh punishment including death penalty. However, by the time of the Qianlong Emperor, however, the adoption of Manchu clothing dressing code was only required to the scholar-official elites and did not apply to the entire male population. The court dress of the Qing dynasty also had to follow the attire of the Manchu people; however, commoner Han men and women were still allowed to wear the hanfu under some circumstances and/or if they fell under the exemptions of the Tifayifu policy. The order of wearing Manchu's hairstyle however still remained as a fundamental rule for all Chinese men.

Over time, the commoner Han men adopted the changshan while Han women continued to the wear the hanfu predominantly in the style of aoqun. The traditional Chinese Hanfu-style of clothing for men was gradually replaced. Over time, the Manchu-style of male dress gained popularity among Han men.

Changshan was considered formal dress for Chinese men before Western-style suits were widely adopted in China. The male changshan could be worn under a western overcoat, and topped with a fedora and scarf. This combination expressed an East Asian modernity in the early 20th century.

The 1949 Communist Revolution ended the wearing of changshan and other traditional clothing in Shanghai. Shanghainese emigrants and refugees carried the fashion to Hong Kong, where it remained popular. Recently in Shanghai and elsewhere in mainland China, many people have revived wearing the Shanghainese changshan. It is made of silk.

Use of changshan
Changshan are traditionally worn for formal pictures, weddings, and other formal Chinese events.  A black changshan, along with a rounded black hat, was, and sometimes still is, the burial attire for Chinese men. Changshan are not often worn  in mainland China, except during traditional Chinese celebrations but, with the revival of some traditional clothing in urban mainland China, the Shanghainese style functions as a stylish party dress (cf. Mao suit).

See also 

 Magua (clothing)
 Qizhuang
 Tangzhuang
 Hanfu

References

External links 

 Neitao (a form of changfu) collected in the Museum of Applied Arts & Sciences

17th-century fashion
18th-century fashion
19th-century fashion
20th-century fashion
21st-century fashion
Chinese traditional clothing
Chinese words and phrases

sv:Cheongsam